Cambria is an unincorporated community and census-designated place (CDP) in Hillsdale County in the U.S. state of Michigan.  The population of the CDP was 258 at the 2020 census.  The community is located within Cambria Township.

History

The area was first settled as early as 1835 when John and Andrew McDermid built a sawmill.  Other settlers arrived by 1837, and a post office opened on December 14, 1840.  The post office was named Woodbridge after Michigan governor William Woodbridge.  By the next year, the community and township was named Cambria after Cambria, New York, which was the hometown of many of the early settlers.  The post office was also renamed Cambria on June 1, 1841, and operated until August 22, 1853.  The community was platted in 1878.  The nearby Cambria Mills post office opened on April 17, 1848.  This post office was later renamed and transferred to Cambria on November 28, 1882, but later closed completely on September 17, 1906.

For the 2020 census, Cambria was included as a newly listed census-designated place, which is included for statistical purposes only.  Cambria continues to remain an unincorporated community with no legal autonomy of its own.

Geography

The community is served by Reading Community Schools to the west in Reading.

Demographics

References 

Census-designated places in Hillsdale County, Michigan
Census-designated places in Michigan
Unincorporated communities in Michigan
Unincorporated communities in Hillsdale County, Michigan
Populated places established in 1835
1835 establishments in Michigan Territory